Aleksandar Džambazov (born  February 3, 1936, in the village Stapar, Vojvodina, Kingdom of Yugoslavia - died on 25.01.2022 in Skopje, Macedonia ) was a Macedonian conductor and composer. He finished Musical academy in Belgrade, and spent majority of his career at Macedonian Radio Television, as a conductor of the Dance and Special orchestra. Has made numerous recordings and live concerts, and has performed in North Macedonia and in many countries abroad (mostly in Slovenia). He has won many (around 50) awards.

He is the spouse of  Anche Dzambazova, father of Igor Džambazov and Tatjana Dzambazova

Work
His work as a composer is prolific and diverse. He is an author of popular songs, jazz scores, children's songs and some classical pieces. He is one of the founders and a longtime composer and conductor of the children's festival Zlatno Slavejče in Skopje. He also wrote scores for theatre plays and movies  Memento, music for the plays Mother, "Two on a swing" etc.) and classical music, such as Seven dance variations for piano and orchestra, Rhapsody for Skopje (1966) - also for piano and orchestra that won him the European Gershwin prize. Has composed choral compositions, and a great number of popular melodies.

Documentary
Documentary about Aleksandar Dzambazov by Buzarovski Archive

Notes

Further reading
Buntevska, Susana (2005). ЕНЦИКЛОПЕДИЈА Британика:С-Ф (Encyclopædia Britannica S-F - Macedonian translation)  (Skopje:Toper). 
Maestro Aleksandar Dzambazov, zivot niz sekavanja, aforizmi, sentenci Juliana Papazova, Eleni Novakovska, CEM. 
http://www.andtheconductoris.eu/index.htm?http://www.eurovisionartists.nl/conductor/dir020.asp?ID=84

Video links

Macedonian conductors (music)
Male conductors (music)
Macedonian composers
Male composers
1936 births
Living people
21st-century conductors (music)
20th-century conductors (music)
20th-century composers
20th-century male musicians
21st-century composers
21st-century male musicians

Eurovision Song Contest conductors
Gershwin Prize recipients